List of Australian organisations with royal patronage

Organisations
 1st/15th Royal New South Wales Lancers
 Australasian Institute of Mining and Metallurgy (incorporated by Royal Charter)
 Australian Academy of the Humanities (incorporated by Royal Charter)
 Australian Academy of Science (incorporated by Royal Charter)
 Australian Institute of Building (incorporated by Royal Charter)
 Australian Racing Museum
 Australian Red Cross Society (incorporated by Royal Charter)
 Chartered Institute of Logistics and Transport in Australia (incorporated by Royal Charter)
 Institute of Chartered Accountants in Australia (incorporated by Royal Charter)
 Institution of Engineers Australia (incorporated by Royal Charter)
 Prince Alfred College
 The University of Sydney 
 Royal Adelaide Golf Club
 Royal Adelaide Hospital
 Royal Aero Club of Western Australia (Inc.)
 Royal Agricultural and Horticultural Society of South Australia (which presents the Royal Adelaide Show and the Royal Adelaide Wine Show)
 Royal Agricultural Society of New South Wales (which presents the Sydney Royal Easter Show)
 Royal Agricultural Society of Queensland (which presents the Royal Toowoomba Show)
 Royal Agricultural Society of Tasmania (which presents the Royal Hobart Show)
 Royal Agricultural Society of the Northern Territory (which presents the Royal Darwin Show and the Alice Springs Royal Show)
 Royal Agricultural Society of Victoria (which presents the Royal Melbourne Show and the Royal Melbourne Wine Show)
 Royal Agricultural Society of Western Australia (which presents the Perth Royal Show)
 Royal Alexandra Hospital for Children (also known as Children's Hospital Westmead)
 Royal Anniversary Regatta Association of NSW (also known as Australia Day Regatta Inc.)
 Royal Anthropological Society of Australasia
 Royal Art Society of New South Wales
 Royal Association of Justices of South Australia (Inc.)
 Royal Association of Justices of Western Australia (Inc.)
 Royal Australasian College of Medical Administrators
 Royal Australasian College of Physicians
 Royal Australasian College of Surgeons
 Royal Australasian College of Dental Surgeons
 Royal Australasian Ornithologists Union
 Royal Australian Air Force
 Royal Australian and New Zealand College of Psychiatrists
 Royal Australian and New Zealand College of Obstetricians and Gynaecologists
 Royal Australian and New Zealand College of Ophthalmologists
 Royal Australian and New Zealand College of Radiologists
 Royal Australian Armoured Corps
 Royal Australian Army Chaplains' Department
 Royal Australian Army Dental Corps
 Royal Australian Army Education Corps
 Royal Australian Army Medical Corps
 Royal Australian Army Nursing Corps
 Royal Australian Army Ordnance Corps
 Royal Australian Army Pay Corps
 Royal Australian Chemical Institute (incorporated by Royal Charter and has permission to use prefix Royal)
 Royal Australian College of General Practitioners
 Royal Australian Corps of Military Police
 Royal Australian Corps of Signals
 Royal Australian Corps of Transport
 Royal Australian Electrical and Mechanical Engineers
 Royal Australian Engineers
 Royal Australian Historical Society
 Royal Australian Infantry Corps
 Royal Australian Institute of Architects
 Royal Australian Navy
 Royal Australian Mint
 Royal Australian Regiment
 Royal Automobile Association of South Australia
 Royal Automobile Club of Australia
 Royal Automobile Club of Queensland
 Royal Automobile Club of Tasmania
 Royal Automobile Club of Victoria
 Royal Automobile Club of Western Australia
 Royal Botanic Gardens, Melbourne and Royal Botanic Gardens, Cranbourne
 Royal Botanic Gardens, Sydney
 Royal Brighton Yacht Club
 Royal Brisbane and Women's Hospital
 Royal Brisbane Institute of Technology
 Royal Caledonian Society of Melbourne
 Royal Caledonian Society of South Australia Inc.
 Royal Canberra Golf Club
 Royal Children's Hospital, Herston
 Royal Children's Hospital, Melbourne
 Royal College of Pathologists of Australasia
 Royal College of Nursing Australia
 Royal Darwin Hospital
 Royal Dental Hospital of Melbourne
 Royal District Nursing Service of South Australia
 Royal Far West Children's Health Scheme (Also known as Royal Far West and Royal Far West Children's Health Scheme and Services for the Aged)
 Royal Federation of Aero Clubs of Australia
 Royal Flying Doctor Service of Australia
 Royal Freemason's Benevolent Institution of New South Wales
 Royal Freemason's Homes, Victoria
 Royal Fremantle Golf Club (Inc.)
 Royal Freshwater Bay Yacht Club
 Royal Geelong Agricultural & Pastoral Society (which presents the Royal Geelong Show)
 Royal Geelong Yacht Club
 Royal Geographical Society of Australasia
 Royal Geographical Society of Queensland
 Royal Geographical Society of South Australia
 Royal Guide Dogs for the Blind Association of Australia
 Royal Historical Society of Queensland (Inc.)
 Royal Historical Society of Victoria
 Royal Hobart Golf Club
 Royal Hobart Hospital
 Royal Hobart Yacht Club
 Royal Horticultural Society of New South Wales
 Royal Horticultural Society of Queensland
 Royal Horticultural Society of Victoria
 Royal Hospital for Women (Sydney)
 Royal Humane Society of Australasia
 Royal Humane Society of New South Wales
 Royal Institute for Deaf and Blind Children
 Royal Life Saving Society Australia
 Royal Melbourne District Nursing Service
 Royal Melbourne Golf Club
 Royal Melbourne Hospital
 Royal Melbourne Institute of Technology
 Royal Melbourne Philharmonic Society
 Royal Melbourne Tennis Club
 Royal Melbourne Yacht Club
 Royal Melbourne Zoological Gardens
 Royal Military College, Duntroon
 Royal Motor Yacht Club of New South Wales
 The Royal National Agricultural and Industrial Association of Queensland (which presents the Royal Queensland Show)
 Royal National Agricultural & Pastoral Society of Tasmania (which presents the Royal Launceston Show)
 Royal National Capital Agricultural Society (which presents the Royal Canberra Show)
 Royal National Park, Sydney
 Royal Newcastle Aero Club
 Royal Newcastle Hospital
 Royal Norfolk Island Agricultural and Historical Society
 Royal North Australia Show Society
 Royal North Shore Hospital (Sydney)
 Royal New South Wales Bowling Association
 Royal New South Wales Canine Council Ltd (also known as Dogs NSW)
 Royal New South Wales Regiment
 Royal Over-Seas League
 Royal Perth Golf Club
 Royal Perth Hospital
 Royal Perth Yacht Club
 Royal Philatelic Society of Victoria
 Royal Port Pirie Yacht Club
 Royal Prince Alfred Hospital
 Royal Prince Alfred Yacht Club
 Royal Prince Edward Yacht Club
 Royal Queensland Aero Club
 Royal Queensland Art Society
 Royal Queensland Bowls Association
 Royal Queensland Bush Children's Health Scheme (also known as Bush Children's)
 Royal Queensland Golf Club
 Royal Queensland Regiment
 Royal Queensland Yacht Squadron
 Royal Randwick Racecourse
 Royal Regiment of Australian Artillery
 Royal Rehabilitation Centre Sydney
 Royal Society for the Prevention of Cruelty to Animals, Australia 
 Royal Society for the Blind
 Royal Society for the Welfare of Mothers and Babies (also known as Tresillian Family Care Centres)
 Royal Society of New South Wales
 Royal Society of Queensland
 Royal Society of South Australia
 Royal Society of St George
 Royal Society of Tasmania
 Royal Society of Victoria
 Royal Society of Western Australia
 Royal South Australia Regiment
 Royal South Australian Bowling Association
 Royal South Australian Deaf Society
 Royal South Australian Society of Arts
 Royal South Australian Yacht Squadron
 Royal South Street Society
 Royal South Yarra Lawn Tennis Club
 Royal Sydney Golf Club
 Royal Sydney Philatelic Club
 Royal Sydney Yacht Squadron
 Royal Talbot Rehabilitation Centre
 Royal Tasmanian Botanical Gardens
 Royal Tasmania Regiment
 Royal United Services Institute of Australia
 Royal United Services Institute of New South Wales Inc.
 Royal United Services Institute of Queensland
 Royal United Services Institute of South Australia Inc.
 Royal United Services Institute of Tasmania
 Royal United Services Institute of Victoria
 Royal United Services Institute of Western Australia
 Royal Victoria Regiment
 Royal Victorian Aero Club
 Royal Victorian Association of Honorary Justices
 Royal Victorian Bowls Association
 Royal Victorian Eye & Ear Hospital
 Royal Victorian Motor Yacht Club
 Royal Volunteer Coastal Patrol
 Royal Western Australia Regiment
 Royal Western Australian Bowling Association (Inc.)
 Royal Western Australian Historical Society (Inc.) of Perth
 Royal Women's Hospital, Melbourne
 Royal Yacht Club of Tasmania
 Royal Yacht Club of Victoria
 Royal Zoological Society of South Australia
 Royal Zoological Society of New South Wales
 Scout Association of Australia (incorporated by Royal Charter)
 The Royal Commonwealth Society
 Royal King's Park Tennis Club

See also

 List of Canadian organizations with royal patronage
 List of Hong Kong organisations with royal patronage
 List of Irish organizations with royal patronage
 List of New Zealand organizations with royal patronage
 List of UK organisations with Royal patronage
 Royal Charter

References

Royal patronage
 
Organisations with royal patronage